David Saul Marshall (12 March 1908 – 12 December 1995), born David Saul Mashal, was a Singaporean lawyer and politician who served as Chief Minister of Singapore from 1955 until his resignation in 1956, after his delegation to London regarding the negotiation for complete home rule and eventual independence of Singapore failed. However, Marshall was instrumental in forging the idea as well as in subsequent negotiations that led to the eventual self-governance of Singapore from the United Kingdom.

Marshall was a leftist nationalist who aspired self-determination of the former British Crown colony—having founded the Labour Front and the Workers' Party. Marshall would renounce partisan politics and become an independent politician from 1963 onward. Singapore would eventually gain its independence in 1965.

In 1978, Marshall became a diplomat and was Singapore's Ambassador to various countries, including France, Portugal, Spain, and Switzerland. During this time, Marshall defended Singapore's interests abroad, despite his old political opponent and fellow barrister Lee Kuan Yew, under his People's Action Party, concurrently in government. Nevertheless, he publicly maintained constructive criticism of some domestic policies that he had disagreed with. 

Marshall retired in 1993, and died two years later of lung cancer in 1995, at the age of 87.

Early life and education
Marshall was born in Singapore on 12 March 1908, to Sephardi Jewish parents Saul Nassim Mashal and Flora Ezekiel Kahn, who had immigrated to Singapore from Baghdad, which was then a part of the Ottoman Empire, where they ran a business. His family name was originally Mashal, which was later anglicised as Marshall in 1920. He had at least six siblings. Marshall received a strict Orthodox Jewish upbringing. 

Marshall attended Saint Joseph's Institution, Saint Andrew's School and Raffles Institution before graduating from the University of London, where he read law.

Legal career and war service 
Upon graduation, Marshall was called to the Bar from the Middle Temple in 1937 before returning to Singapore to commence a legal career.

In 1938, following the German occupation of Czechoslovakia, Marshall volunteered for military service with a British reserve unit, the Straits Settlements Volunteer Force. He was assigned to "B" Company, 1st Battalion (1SSVF)—a company composed mostly of continental Europe expatriates. He was detained briefly by military police after objecting to the fact that he and other volunteers classified as "Asian" were paid at half the rate received by "European" members of the SSVF.

In February 1942, he saw action against the Imperial Japanese Army, in the Holland Road area, during the last few days of the Battle of Singapore. Marshall became a prisoner-of-war (POW) following the British surrender. He was initially interned in Changi Prison before being sent to a forced labour camp in Japan.

Reflecting later on his experience as a POW, Marshall commented:

Most of Marshall's immediate family had emigrated to Australia before the war began. After the war ended Marshall spent time with his family in Australia, before returning to Singapore in 1946.

He became a successful and prominent criminal lawyer. Known for his sharp eloquence and imposing stance, Marshall claimed that he had secured 99 acquittals out of 100 cases he defended for murder during Singapore's period of having trial by jury. When Lee Kuan Yew later abolished Singapore's jury system (1969), he cited Marshall's record as an illustration of its "inadequacy".

Political career
In April 1955, Marshall led the left-wing Labour Front to a narrow victory in Singapore's first Legislative Assembly elections. He formed a minority government and became Chief Minister. He resigned in April 1956 after a failed delegation to London to negotiate for complete self-rule.

After resigning, Marshall visited China for two months at the invitation of Zhou Enlai, the Chinese Premier. Contacted by a representative of a group of over 400 Russian Jews who were being refused exit from Shanghai by the Chinese authorities, Marshall spoke with Zhou and managed to have them released.

After returning from China, Marshall stayed on the backbenches before quitting the Labour Front and as a member of the Legislative Assembly in 1957. On 7 November 1957, he founded the Workers' Party of Singapore (WP). 

Marshall lost his seat in Cairnhill Single Member Constituency to Lim Yew Hock, the Chief Minister, in the 1959 general election as a WP candidate, but won in Anson Single Member Constituency in the 1961 by-election. He resigned from the Workers' Party in January 1963 after a spat with the party. 

After losing his seat again in the 1963 general election as an independent candidate, he returned to practice law and remained active in politics.

Although Marshall consistently praised Lee Kuan Yew and People's Action Party for their economic successes, he also condemned the repression of freedom of speech and public freedoms. "We should keep in mind the horrors of [China's] Cultural Revolution, brought about by the cult of subservience to authority and primacy of society over the individual before we point the accusing finger at those who believe that respect for the individual is the basis of human civilisation", he said.

From 1978 to 1993, Marshall served as Singapore's Ambassador to France, Portugal, Spain, and Switzerland. As an ambassador, Marshall always defended Singapore's interests, despite his differences with Lee Kuan Yew's government. He retired from the diplomatic corps in 1993.

Personal life
Marshall married Jean Mary Gray in 1961. Jean was born on 13 April 1926 in Kent, South East England, she came to Malaya in 1953 to take up a post with the Red Cross as a medical social worker. They had four children and six grandchildren.

Jean Marshall died in Singapore on 29 March 2021, two weeks before her 95th birthday.

Death
Marshall died in 1995 of lung cancer.

Legacy 
In 2011, the Marshall estate donated a bust of Marshall created by Hungarian sculptor Peter Lambda to the Singapore Management University (SMU) School of Law's moot court, which is named after Marshall. His widow Jean expressed the hope that the tribute would inspire all law students at SMU to pursue the qualities of passion, diligence, courage and integrity that had distinguished her late husband's remarkable achievements.

See also
 History of the Jews in Singapore

References

External links

 

1908 births
1995 deaths
20th-century Singaporean lawyers
Alumni of the University of London
Ambassadors of Singapore to France
Ambassadors of Singapore to Portugal
Ambassadors of Singapore to Spain
Ambassadors of Singapore to Switzerland
Deaths from cancer in Singapore
Deaths from lung cancer
Jewish Singaporean politicians
Jewish socialists
Labour Front politicians
Members of the Middle Temple
Members of the Parliament of Singapore
Raffles Institution alumni
Saint Andrew's School, Singapore alumni
Singaporean Jews
Singaporean people of Iraqi-Jewish descent
Workers' Party (Singapore) politicians
Malaysian people of Iraqi-Jewish descent
Malaysian Jews
Jewish prime ministers
20th-century Singaporean politicians
Asian Sephardi Jews